Gerde may refer to:

People

Oszkár Gerde (1883-1944), Hungarian 2x Olympic champion sabre fencer

Places

Gerde, Hautes-Pyrénées, commune in the Hautes-Pyrénées department, France 
Gerde, Hungary, village in the Baranya county, Hungary